The Hudson Public Library is located in Hudson, Wisconsin.

History
A Carnegie library, it was formally established in 1903, though the building was not constructed until the following year. It was listed on the National Register of Historic Places in 1984 and on the State Register of Historic Places in 1989.

See also
List of Carnegie libraries in Wisconsin

References

Libraries on the National Register of Historic Places in Wisconsin
National Register of Historic Places in St. Croix County, Wisconsin
Carnegie libraries in Wisconsin
Neoclassical architecture in Wisconsin
Limestone buildings in the United States
Library buildings completed in 1904